Lee Anne Merklinger (born September 16, 1984) is Canadian female curler from Nepean, Ontario. Merklinger played second for the Sherry Middaugh rink on the World Curling Tour from 2010 to 2018. Among the team's accomplishments were finishing runners up at the 2013 Canadian Olympic Curling Trials and winning the 2012 Curlers Corner Autumn Gold Curling Classic Grand Slam event.

Teams and events

Personal life
Merklinger is a member of a famous curling family. Her older brother Dave Merklinger is one of the leading Canadian and international icemakers. Her older half-sister Anne Merklinger is a former Tournament of Hearts champion and medallist and  bronze medallist. Her twin sister Breanne Merklinger and brother Bill Merklinger are competitive curlers as well; Bill was the alternate for the Territories team at the 2015 Brier.

Outside of curling, Merklinger works for the Government of Canada, as Policy Analyst for Indigenous Services Canada. She is a member of the Muscowpetung First Nation.

References

External links
 
 
 

1984 births
Living people
21st-century First Nations people
Canada Cup (curling) participants
Canadian women curlers
First Nations sportspeople
Saulteaux people
Curlers from Ottawa
Twin sportspeople
First Nations women
First Nations sportswomen